Operation Market Garden is a 1985 video game published by Strategic Simulations.

Gameplay
Operation Market Garden is a game in which the Allies of World War II try to take over the Ruhr district in late 1944.

Reception
Bob Proctor reviewed the game for Computer Gaming World, and stated that "an entire game can be concluded in a single evening. I recommend this game to all WW II fans."

Reviews
Computer Gaming World - Dec, 1991

References

External links
Review in Antic
Review in Family Computing
Review in Compute!'s Gazette

1985 video games
Strategic Simulations games